Kristoff Deprez (born 12 December 1981 in Ghent) is a Belgian footballer who plays as a goalkeeper, last appearing with Dutch third division club HSV Hoek.

References

1981 births
Living people
Belgian footballers
K.S.C. Lokeren Oost-Vlaanderen players
HSV Hoek players
K.M.S.K. Deinze players
Footballers from Ghent

Association football goalkeepers
K.R.C. Gent players